The 2016–17 La Salle Explorers women's basketball team represented La Salle University during the 2016–17 NCAA Division I women's basketball season. The Explorers, led by sixth year head coach Jeff Williams, played their home games at Tom Gola Arena and are members of the Atlantic 10 Conference. They finished the season 17–13, 9–7 in A-10 play to finish in a tie for sixth place. They advanced to the quarterfinals of the A-10 women's tournament where they lost to Duquesne.

2016–17 media

La Salle Explorers Sports Network
Select Explorers games will be broadcast online by the La Salle Portal. The A-10 Digital Network will carry all non-televised Explorers home games and most conference road games.

Roster

Schedule

|-
!colspan=9 style="background:#00386B; color:#FFC700;"| Regular season

|-
!colspan=9 style="background:#00386B; color:#FFC700;"| Atlantic 10 Women's Tournament

Rankings
2016–17 NCAA Division I women's basketball rankings

See also
 2016–17 La Salle Explorers men's basketball team

References

La Salle
La Salle Explorers women's basketball seasons
La Salle
La Salle